Saint Paul's Episcopal Church is a historic building in Columbus, Ohio.

Description and history
Built in 1903, it served as an Episcopal church in the past. It is an example of Late Gothic Revival style architecture. The large stone building displays simple massing, buttresses and cut stone detailing that exemplifies that style. On the south facade the arched entry, in a projecting bay, is echoed by the large sanctuary window. This fenestration features a Tudor arch and extensive tracery. The building is located at 787 E. Broad Street. The stone building is the second church built by the local Episcopalian congregation. It was listed on the National Register of Historic Places on December 17, 1986, as part of a group of properties, the "East Broad Street Multiple Resource Area".

See also
 History of Ohio
 History of religion in the United States
 National Register of Historic Places listings in Columbus, Ohio

References

External links
 
 , current building user
 
 

Churches in Columbus, Ohio
Churches completed in 1903
20th-century Episcopal church buildings
National Register of Historic Places in Columbus, Ohio
Churches on the National Register of Historic Places in Ohio
Gothic Revival church buildings in Ohio
Broad Street (Columbus, Ohio)